Pierre-Châtel is a commune in the Isère department in southeastern France.

Geography
Lac de Pierre-Châtel and the  Pierre Percée are located in the commune.

Population

Personalities
Peter II of Savoy and Boniface I of Challant died in Pierre-Châtel, respectively in 1268 and 1426.

See also
Communes of the Isère department

References

Communes of Isère
Isère communes articles needing translation from French Wikipedia